Scardia boletella is a moth, belonging to the family Tineidae. The species was first described by Johan Christian Fabricius in 1794.

It is native to Europe.

References

Scardiinae